Polydamas (gen. Πολυδάμαντος, Polydámas, Polydámantos) was a hetairos of Macedonian or Thessalian origin. He was in Parmenion's guard, in the Pharsalian squadron. He was later sent by Alexander to Cleander with the command that Parmenion be put to death and was nearly lynched by Parmenion's troops after the order was carried out.

References
 Who's Who in the Age of Alexander the Great by Waldemar Heckel (2008) 

Generals of Alexander the Great
Hetairoi
Ancient Thessalians
Ancient Macedonian generals
Ancient Thessalian generals
4th-century BC Greek people